Soup's On is a 1948 Donald Duck animated short film directed by Jack Hannah, produced in Technicolor by Walt Disney Productions and released to theaters by RKO Radio Pictures. In the short, Donald cooks a turkey dinner for his nephews Huey, Dewey and Louie, but when they come to the table with dirty hands, he punishes them by sending them to bed. The nephews escalate the battle, and when Donald is knocked unconscious, they trick him into thinking that he has died and become an angel.

While Donald's relationship with his nephews Huey, Dewey and Louie had deepened significantly by 1948 in Carl Barks' Duck comics, the nephews of the cartoons are still the identical mischievous troublemakers that they were when first introduced ten years earlier. The Encyclopedia of Walt Disney's Animated Characters spotlights this short as a particularly potent example of the nephews' malicious behavior:

Plot
Donald Duck is preparing a turkey dinner, while his nephews play Apaches. When he calls his nephews in for dinner, they start fighting over the turkey. Donald orders the dirty ducks to take a bath, and they try to trick him by running the water. But Donald spots that Louie's hand is still dirty, and he sends them to their room. The ducks pretend to cry themselves to sleep, making Donald feel guilty. When he comes upstairs to tell them they're forgiven, they trick him into snapping his fingers on a mousetrap, and they grab the food and run.

Donald chases his nephews out the door, but as he rounds a curve, he falls off a cliff and narrowly misses being hit by a boulder, only to be knocked out by a small rock. When he regains consciousness, the nephews have dressed Donald up as an angel, and are pretending to be crying over his 'squashed' body. He gives them a tearful goodbye, and they rush home to eat. When Donald tries to fly, he hits the ground and realizes that it was a joke.

When he gets home and finds his nephews feasting on the turkey, the "angel" Donald turns into a devil in a fit of rage, and chases them out of the house and across the countryside.

Voice cast
 Clarence Nash as Donald Duck, Huey, Dewey, and Louie

Music
As the cartoon begins, Donald sings a chorus of "Zip-a-Dee-Doo-Dah", a song from Disney's 1946 film Song of the South.

Television
 Walt Disney's Wonderful World of Color, episode #8.11: "Kids is Kids"
 Good Morning, Mickey!, episode #32
 Mickey's Mouse Tracks, episode #64
 Donald's Quack Attack, episode #69
 The Ink and Paint Club, episode #1.51: "Triple Trouble"

Home media
The short was released on December 11, 2007 on Walt Disney Treasures: The Chronological Donald, Volume Three: 1947-1950.

Additional release include:
 Kids is Kids Starring Donald Duck (VHS)
 Huey, Dewey and Louie's Greatest Hits (VHS)
 Walt Disney's Funny Factory, Vol. 4: Huey, Dewey, and Louie (DVD)

References

1948 animated films
1948 films
Donald Duck short films
1940s Disney animated short films
Films directed by Jack Hannah
Films produced by Walt Disney
Films scored by Oliver Wallace
1940s English-language films